The 1983 Auburn Tigers football team represented Auburn University in the 1983 NCAA Division I-A football season. Coached by Pat Dye, the team finished the season with an 11–1 record and won their first Southeastern Conference (SEC) title since 1957. The team was named national champion by NCAA-designated major selectors of Billingsley, College Football Researchers Association, and The New York Times, while named co-national champion by both Rothman and Sagarin.

Season
The squad featured several star players who went on to long professional careers including Bo Jackson, Randy Campbell, Tommie Agee, Lionel James, Donnie Humphrey, Steve Wallace and Al Del Greco. Prior to the season, Dye became the first coach in the SEC to require players to take blood and urine tests for drugs. Also prior to the season, fullback Greg Pratt collapsed after making his required time in running tests and died a short time later.

The team capped an 11–1 season, with a 9–7 victory over 3 loss Michigan in the Sugar Bowl. Despite having lost to Texas by 13 points at home the Tigers ended ranked third in the final AP and the UPI Coaches' poll ahead of the 1 loss Longhorns as Miami jumped from 5th from the AP and 4th from the UPI Coaches' poll to claim the AP/UPI Coaches' National Championship award. Auburn had played the toughest schedule in the nation, including nine bowl teams, eight of which were ranked in the top 20 (five in the top ten), and two teams Auburn faced would compete against each other in the 1983 Florida Citrus Bowl (Tennessee won the game against Maryland 30–23).

Schedule

Roster

Rankings

Season summary

Southern Miss

Texas

Florida State

Florida

at Georgia

vs. Alabama

Sophomore Bo Jackson ran for 256 yards and 2 touchdowns as the Tigers won the SEC title outright. His long touchdown runs – 69 yards and 71 yards, respectively – bookended the day's scoring.

vs. Michigan (Sugar Bowl)

References

Auburn
Auburn Tigers football seasons
Southeastern Conference football champion seasons
Sugar Bowl champion seasons
Auburn Tigers football